Joanna Edwards  (born 5 February 1970) is a New Zealand international lawn bowls competitor. She has won two world titles and three Commonwealth Games gold medals.

Bowls career

Outdoors
At the 2002 Commonwealth Games she won a gold medal along with Sharon Sims in the women's pairs event. She has twice won the gold medal at the World Outdoor Bowls Championships in the pairs events: in 2004 with Sharon Sims; and in 2008 with Val Smith.

In 2014 she won a second Commonwealth Games gold medal after winning the women's singles in Glasgow.

In 2016, she won a bronze medal at the 2016 World Outdoor Bowls Championship in Christchurch in the singles and a silver medal with Angela Boyd in the pairs.

She was selected as part of the New Zealand team for the 2018 Commonwealth Games on the Gold Coast in Queensland, where she claimed a gold medal in the Singles.

In 2020 she was selected for the 2020 World Outdoor Bowls Championship in Australia.

In addition to World Bowls and Commonwealth Games success she has won five gold medals and (nine medals in total) at the Asia Pacific Bowls Championships and excelled at the 2015 APL (Australian Premier League), she was the only woman competing in the eight-team tournament featuring 24 of the world's top players and played alongside her countrymen Ali Forsyth and Shannon McIlroy to win the title at Club Pine Rivers.

Indoors
Edwards has won six World Cup Singles titles (a women's record) with the latest success being in 2019. Previous wins were in 2009, 2010, 2011, 2013 and 2017.

Honours
In the 2014 Queen's Birthday Honours, Edwards was appointed a Member of the New Zealand Order of Merit, for services to lawn bowls.

References

External links
 
 
 
 
 

Living people
1970 births
New Zealand female bowls players
Commonwealth Games gold medallists for New Zealand
Bowls players at the 2002 Commonwealth Games
Bowls players at the 2006 Commonwealth Games
Bowls players at the 2014 Commonwealth Games
Bowls players at the 2018 Commonwealth Games
Members of the New Zealand Order of Merit
Bowls World Champions
Commonwealth Games medallists in lawn bowls
Medallists at the 2002 Commonwealth Games
Medallists at the 2014 Commonwealth Games
Medallists at the 2018 Commonwealth Games